The 2022 Clare Senior Football Championship was the 127th staging of the Clare Senior Football Championship since its establishment by the Clare County Board in 1887.

The 2021 champions, and holders of the Jack Daly Cup were Éire Óg, Ennis who bridged a fifteen year gap from 2006 to win their nineteenth overall title. They defeated the reigning champions Kilmurry-Ibrickane by 1-11 to 0-09 in Cusack Park, Ennis.

The draws for the 2022 Clare club championships took place in April 2022.

Senior Championship Fixtures

Group stage
 Three groups of four.
 2021 semi-finalists are seeded and kept separate.
 As there will be two 2021 semi-finalists in Group A, there will be an extra quarter-final place available.
 A draw between the three second-placed teams in Groups A-C will determine the fourth seeded quarter-finalist.
 Each team plays all the other teams in their group once. Two points are awarded for a win and one for a draw.
 The top three teams from Group A and the top two teams from Groups B and C advance to Quarter-Finals
 The third-placed teams from Groups B and C advance to Preliminary Quarter-Final
 The three bottom-placed teams in each group contest Relegation Playoffs

Group A

Group B

Group C

Preliminary Quarter-Final
 Played by two third-placed teams from Groups B and C

Quarter-finals
 Played by top two placed teams from Groups A-C, third-placed team from Group A, and winners of Preliminary Quarter-Final

Semi-finals

County Final

Other Fixtures

Relegation Playoffs 
 Played by the three bottom-placed teams from Groups A-C
 Loser of Playoff 2 relegated to Intermediate for 2023

References

External links

Clare Senior Football Championship
Clare Senior Football Championship
Clare SFC